The State Bridge, at State Bridge, Colorado, off Colorado State Highway 131, was a two-span Howe truss bridge built in 1890.  It was listed on the National Register of Historic Places in 1985.

It was built by the Missouri Valley Bridge Company, low bidder for the contract.  The bridge was the third-earliest bridge designed and built for the Colorado State Engineer, and was the oldest surviving as of 1983.  When listed, with only one of its two spans surviving, it was one of the oldest vehicular bridges in the state.

The second span has been lost.

References

External links

Bridges in Colorado
National Register of Historic Places in Eagle County, Colorado
Bridges completed in 1890